"Finders Keepers" is a song by English singer and songwriter Mabel featuring English singer Kojo Funds. It was released on 26 May 2017 as the lead single off the former's debut EP Bedroom. It was also included on her debut mixtape Ivy to Roses (2017) and on her debut album High Expectations (2019) as a bonus track. The song peaked at number eight on the UK Singles Chart.

Music video
The music video was uploaded to Mabel's Vevo page on YouTube on 17 August 2017. The video features Mabel and Kojo Funds dancing and performing the song with close up shots of the singers, couples kissing and a group dancing at night.

At the very end of the video, a 15-second preview is given to another song with the words, "To Be Continued..." The lyrics to the song are, "Now we're dancing on a fine line, somewhere between a minute and a lifetime..." The song turned out to be "Fine Line" released on 19 January 2018, her second collaboration with Not3s (the first was "My Lover" (Remix) in 2017). The music video for that song came out on 25 January 2018.

As of December 2020, the music video has had over 58 million views on YouTube.

Track listing
Digital download – Remixes
"Finders Keepers" (Dusk Remix) – 3:32
"Finders Keepers" (Melé Remix) – 4:02

Credits and personnel
Credits adapted from AllMusic.

 Mabel McVey – vocals, composition
 JD. Reid – composition
 Marlon Roudette – composition
 Errol Bellot – composition
 Steven Marsden – composition
 Kojo Funds – vocals

Charts

Weekly charts

Year-end charts

Certifications

References

Mabel (singer) songs
2017 singles
2017 songs
Songs written by Marlon Roudette
Polydor Records singles
Songs written by Mabel (singer)